The 1995 Chinese Football Super Cup (Chinese: 1995年中国足球超霸杯赛) was the first edition of the Chinese Football Super Cup, contested by Chinese Jia-A League 1995 winners Shanghai Shenhua and 1995 Chinese FA Cup winners Jinan Taishan. Fan Zhiyi scored the first goal of the Chinese Football Super Cup, which ensured Shanghai Shenhua win their first Chinese Football Super Cup title.

Match details

References 

1995 in Chinese football
1995